Robert Henry Thouless (15 July 1894 – 25 September 1984) was an English psychologist and parapsychologist. He is best known as the author of Straight and Crooked Thinking (1930, 1953), which describes flaws in reasoning and argument.

Career

He studied at Cambridge University where he earned B.A. hons in 1914, an M.A. in 1919 and a PhD in 1922. He was a lecturer in psychology at the universities of Manchester, Glasgow and a Fellow of Corpus Christi College in the University of Cambridge. He wrote on parapsychology and conducted experiments in card-calling and psychokinesis. His own experiments did not confirm the results of J. B. Rhine and he criticised the experimental protocols of previous experimenters.
He is credited with introducing the word psi as a term for parapsychological phenomena in a 1942 article in the British Journal of Psychology. He served as president of the Society for Psychical Research from 1942 to 1944.
Thouless identified as a "Christian psychologist". He questioned the alleged visions of Jesus Christ that the mystic Julian of Norwich reported to have experienced and concluded they were the result of hallucinations.

Attempt to prove dead could communicate with the living 

In 1948 he created a test that he thought could prove that he could communicate with living people after his death. One way of testing this was to ask dying people to write a message that would be sealed, then ask a medium to try to contact the deceased for the message. The weakness in this was that the medium might have been shown the message before the seance, so he enciphered it using keywords he refused to divulge. The ciphertext was "BTYRR OOFLH KCDXK FWPCZ KTADR GFHKA HTYXO ALZUP PYPVF AYMMF SDLR UVUB".

The Survival Research Foundation based in Miami offered a reward of $1000 to anyone who could break the cipher within three years of Thouless' death.

In 1995 the cipher was broken by James Gillogly who wrote cryptanalysis software to crack the variation of the playfair cipher used. The deciphered message read "This is a cipher which will not be read unless I give the keywords." The keywords were black and beauty.

Reception

His An Introduction to the Psychology of Religion (1923, reprinted 1961) received a mixed reception from academics. One criticism of the book was the over-reliance of Freud's psychoanalyst approach to the subject. Professor James E. Dittes wrote that despite the obsolete Freudian views it is a useful elementary guide to the psychology of religion.

Psychologist John Beloff commenting on Thouless and his parapsychological studies wrote:

"Although his own ESP experiments were not notably successful, he made an original contribution to the study of PK (psychokinesis) with dice, using himself as subject. Unlike Rhine, however, he never lost interest in the age old topic of an afterlife... He even devised a coded message, which he took with him to the grave, in the hope that he might demonstrate survival by revealing the code posthumously through a medium. No such message, however, has yet been received."

Psychologist L. Börje Löfgren has criticised Thouless for endorsing the mentalist Frederick Marion as a genuine psychic. He suggested that "Thouless is an honest man, but his powers of self-deception must be rather considerable."

Personal life
Robert Thouless married Priscilla Gorton, an English teacher, and was the father of the Nobel Prize-winning physicist David Thouless.

Publications
An Introduction to the Psychology of Religion (1923, 1961)
The Lady Julian: A Psychological Study (1924)
Social Psychology: A Text Book for Students of Economics (1925)
Control of the Mind (1929)
How to Think Straight (1948)
Experimental Psychical Research (1963)
Mind and Consciousness in Experimental Psychology (1963)
Rationality and Prejudice (1964)
Straight and Crooked Thinking (1968)
From Anecdote to Experiment in Psychical Research (1972)

References

External links
An Encyclopedia of Claims, Frauds, and Hoaxes of the Occult and Supernatural – describes Thouless' test for survival after death.
David J. Thouless, Robert's son - Nobel prize winning physicist.

1894 births
1984 deaths
Academics of the University of Glasgow
Academics of the University of Manchester
British psychologists
Fellows of Corpus Christi College, Cambridge
Parapsychologists
People educated at the City of Norwich School
Presidents of the British Psychological Society
20th-century psychologists